Ross Township is one of sixteen townships in Franklin County, Iowa, United States.  As of the 2010 census, its population was 303 and it contained 131 housing units.

History
Ross Township was organized in 1879. It was named for Abner S. Ross, an early settler.

Geography

Cities, towns, villages
 Chapin

Cemeteries
The township contains Saint John Zion Cemetery and Way Side Cemetery.

Transportation
 U.S. Route 65

School districts
 Hampton-Dumont Community School District
 West Fork Community School District

Political districts
 Iowa's 4th congressional district
 State House District 54
 State Senate District 27

References

External links
 City-Data.com

Townships in Iowa
Townships in Franklin County, Iowa
1879 establishments in Iowa